The Matchless Mine is located in Lake County, Colorado. It made Horace Tabor's fortune. His wife, Baby Doe Tabor, died in the superintendent's cabin. The mine is listed on the National Register of Historic Places. It is part of the National Mining Hall of Fame and Museum.

According to legend, Horace Tabor’s dying instructions to his wife were: “Hold onto the Matchless mine, it will make millions.”  After some years in Denver, Baby Doe moved into a cabin next to the mine.  She lost the mine in 1927, when it was sold to satisfy a debt, but the new owners allowed Baby Doe to stay in the cabin.

In the winter of 1935, after a snowstorm, some neighbors noticed that no smoke was coming out of the chimney at the Matchless mine cabin.  Investigating, they found Baby Doe, her body frozen on the floor.

See also
National Register of Historic Places listings in Lake County, Colorado

References

Buildings and structures in Lake County, Colorado
Industrial buildings and structures on the National Register of Historic Places in Colorado
Mines in Colorado
National Register of Historic Places in Lake County, Colorado